1-Adamantanecarboxylic acid is an organic compound with the formula .  A white solid, it is the simplest carboxylic acid derivative of adamantane.  The compound is notable for its synthesis by carboxylation of adamantane.  1-Adamantanecarboxylic acid is unusual in forming mononuclear tris(carboxylate) coordination complexes of the formula [M(O2CR)3]− (M = Mn, Ni, Co, Zn).

References

Adamantanes
Carboxylic acids